Evgeny Perlin (- born in Karma, Gomel Region) is a Belarusian journalist and television presenter.

On 26 October 2018, it was announced that Perlin would host the Junior Eurovision Song Contest 2018, alongside singers Helena Meraai and Zinaida Kupriyanovich, in Minsk.

On 13 August 2020 he announced his resignation from the Belarusian state television (BTRC) amid the ongoing protests in the country.

References

External links 
 

Belarusian journalists
Belarusian State University alumni
Living people
People from Karma District
Belarusian television presenters
1990 births